Mr. Unbelievable is a 2015 Singaporean musical comedy film directed by Ong Kuo Sin, and starring Chen Tianwen as the titular protagonist. It is based on the viral song "Unbelievable" and was released in cinemas in Singapore on December 3, 2015, and in Malaysia on January 14, 2016.

Plot
Eric Kwek Hock Seng is born on 9 August 1965, the day Singapore declared its independence, and is abandoned as a baby in a basket with a broccoli. He is taken in by Master Lo Man. Lo Man trains Eric to perform in the getai industry, although his looks has caused setbacks. Through the years, he becomes one who is a patriotic Singaporean, and is hugely supportive of national campaigns. When Lo Man's getai business becomes unable to keep up with the times, he decided to add English lyrics to Chinese songs, much to the dismay to Master Lo Man, his friends, Ah Fei and Ah Hua, and frequent getai-goers. At the same time, his poor command of the English language made it worse, resulting in certain phrases, such as "stunned like vegetable", sounding relatively wonky. However, his disciple, Lawrence, is extremely supportive of this decision, as he is encouraged by his mother to listen to Eric's songs. To show his strong will and persistence in order to fulfil his dreams, Eric is determined to go on an unbelievable musical journey, even at the ripe age of 50. With the help of Lawrence, Eric managed to become a sensation through his song "Unbelievable".

Cast
 Chen Tianwen as Eric Kwek Hock Seng, a 50-year-old getai performer
 Genghis Chai as Eric Kwek Hock Seng as a baby
Liu Lingling as Man Li, a beer promoter and Eric's love interest
 Marcus Chin as Master Lo Man, master of the singing troupe and Eric's adoptive father
 Roy Li as Ah Fei, Lo Man's disciple
 Jaime Teo as Ah Hua, Lo Man's daughter and disciple, and Eric's childhood lover
 Tosh Zhang as Lawrence, a part-time actor, Eric's disciple and forever-loyal fan
 Hayley Woo as Omega Cui
 Hong Huifang as a Samsui woman who is a fan of Eric's music
 Ezann Lee as her younger self
 Zhang Wei as a getai show organiser
 Zhang Wenxiang as Man Li's boss
 Jim Lim as TV Director
 Daren Tan as TV Male Lead
 Silver Ang as Competition Host
 Gadrick Chin as Daniel
 Chua Jin Sen as Coffeeshop Kid

Production
The huge success of Chen's "Unbelievable" music video, which garnered 3.2 million views on Facebook and YouTube prompted director Ong Kuo Sin to come up with a feature film and provide a background story for it. The film was shot in 15 days starting from 14 September 2015.

In order to sing Hokkien songs in the film, Jaime Teo had to watch online videos to brush up on the dialect.

Reception
Yip Wai Yee of The Straits Times gave Mr. Unbelievable 2 out of 5 stars, attributing it to Chen's portrayal of his teenage character "unconvincing", and that "to milk (the original music video) and drag it into a full-length feature film makes the nonsense go on for far too long".

Marcus Goh of Yahoo! Movies called it "intentionally cheesy and corny, which works well given the subject matter of the film and the different language mediums it spans". At the same time, "it definitely appeals to the older crowd, but there are elements for the younger audience".

Jocelyn Lee of The New Paper rated Mr. Unbelievable a 2 out of 5, as it "is hindered by a thin plot, and relies on slapstick humour, making it utterly forgettable".

Box office
Mr. Unbelievable collected $25,000 on its opening day, making it the biggest opener among Singaporean films, excluding Chinese New Year-related films.

Sequel
A sequel has been planned to be released in 2016, according to an interview with Chen Tianwen by The New Paper. This had been confirmed by both Chen and Ong after Chen's huge breakthrough.

References

External links
 

2015 films
Hokkien-language films
Singaporean musical comedy films
Films shot in Singapore
Films set in Singapore
2010s musical comedy films
Films based on television series
Films based on songs
2015 comedy films
2010s English-language films
2010s Mandarin-language films